The Hørring cabinet was formed on 7 August 1897 and consisted entirely of members of the party Højre. It was created following Tage Reedtz-Thott's resignation as Council President, when Hugo Egmont Hørring of the conservative party Højre became the leader of the new Danish cabinet, replacing the Cabinet of Reedtz-Thott.

The cabinet was replaced by the Sehested cabinet on 27 April 1900.

List of ministers and portfolios
The cabinet consisted of these ministers:

Some of the terms in the table begin before 7 August 1897 or end after 27 April 1900 because the minister was in the Reedtz-Thott or Sehested cabinet as well.

References

1897 establishments in Denmark
Horring
Cabinets disestablished in 1900
Cabinets established in 1897